William Ferris may refer to:

William H. Ferris (1874–1941), African American journalist and author 
William R. Ferris (born 1942), folklorist and scholar of the U.S. South, former chair of the National Endowment for the Humanities
William Ferris (politician) (1855–1917), Australian politician